Collin William Martin Freeland  (born 31 January 1933) is a former senior Australian public servant and policymaker. He is best known for his time heading the Department of Aviation and the Department of Transport in the 1980s.

Life and career
Collin Freeland was born in the 1930s. He was awarded a Bachelor of Engineering, and moved to Canberra in 1969.

In August 1980, Freeland was appointed to his first Secretary job, as head of the Department of Housing and Construction.

In May 1982, Freeland was appointed Secretary of the Department of Aviation. In February 1986 he was transferred to head the Department of Transport. When departments of the Australian Government were restructured in 1987, he was appointed an Associate Secretary of the Department of Transport and Communications.

Between 1988 and 1990, Freeland was chief executive and managing director of the Civil Aviation Authority.

In September 1992, Freeland was appointed Chairman of the National Road Trauma Advisory Council.

Awards
Collin Freeland was appointed an Officer of the Order of Australia in June 1988 in recognition of his public service.

References

Living people
1933 births
Australian public servants
Officers of the Order of Australia